Renaissance reenactment is historical reenactment of events of the Renaissance period and the European Age of Exploration. In its broadest use, it encompasses reenactment of periods from the early 15th century through the mid-18th century. Reenactments of earlier events are commonly termed medieval reenactment, while more recent events are modern reenactment. Events and periods within Renaissance reenactment vary by region and nation, but include the English Civil War in the United Kingdom, the Eighty Years' War in the Low Countries (particularly the Netherlands), L'Escalade in Switzerland, the Polish–Lithuanian Commonwealth in eastern Europe, and the early colonial period in the United States and Canada.

Renaissance fairs, a primarily American phenomenon, are, when historically based, considered part of Renaissance reenactment; however, some fairs favor entertainment over authenticity,

See also
 The Sealed Knot (reenactment), English Civil War reenactors, the largest reenactment and historical society in the UK
 English Civil War Society, reenactors of the First and Second English Civil War
 Kentwell Hall, English re-enactment of the Tudor period
 Kompania Wolontarska, reenactors of the Polish-Lithuanian Commonwealth, including the Khmelnytsky Uprising and the Deluge
 List of Renaissance fairs

References

External links

 
Historical reenactment by period